Yancy Bailey Spencer III (July 2, 1950 – February 14, 2011) was a surfer from Pensacola, Florida, who was widely regarded as the father of Gulf Coast surfing.

Family
He was son of Yancy Bailey Spencer Jr. (North Carolina, 1929 - 2010), who served in the United States of America Navy between 1938 and 1962, Private First Class (PFC) in World War II who reached the rank of Chief Petty Officer (CPO), and wife Patricia Lee Rice.

He married his second wife Lydia Ann Brown, daughter of Eugene Fuller "Gene" Brown II and wife Maxine Boatright. He married a third time on April 9, 1988, with Helen Delabar Martison.

He had three children, including actress Abigail Spencer.

Death
Yancy died while surfing at County Line, California, on February 14, 2011. The cause of death was thought to be a major heart attack.

A statue of him was erected on Pensacola Beach, Florida.

References

1950 births
2011 deaths
American surfers
Sportspeople from California
Sportspeople from Pensacola, Florida